Ian Usher (born 25 July 1963) is an English traveller, author and public speaker. He is best known for his 2008 "life for sale" listing on eBay following divorce from his wife, Laura.

Early life 

Usher grew up in Barnard Castle, Co Durham, England and attended the Barnard Castle School.

Following school, he lived on a kibbutz in Israel and travelled through Europe. He gained a BEd teaching degree in Outdoor Education at Liverpool Polytechnic in 1985.

Career 

He worked with British Rail as a Youth Leadership and Teamwork Counselor before opening Scarborough Jet Skiing on England's north east coast with his partner, Bruce Jones.

In 2001 he moved to Australia where he worked in sales, marketing and management.

In 2008, after the break up of his marriage, Usher listed his "life for sale" on eBay. He gained world wide notoriety.
The final price ended up at $399,300.

His stated goal for the eBay auction was a "fresh start," so, following the sale, he travelled across the globe in pursuit of a series of 100 goals, which were achieved in 100 weeks. His two-year "bucket list" ended in New York City in the crown of the Statue of Liberty on 4 July 2010.

He has since presented inspirational talks for companies in both the USA and Europe. In November 2013, he spoke to an audience of 900 at the VolksTheater at TEDxVienna.
The talk, "A Life Unlimited", can be viewed online.

Books 

He wrote two books, 2008's A Life Sold and 2013's Paradise Delayed. In A Life Sold, he documented two years of travel. The movie rights were purchased by Walt Disney Pictures, which commissioned a project called Life for Sale. It was scheduled to be produced by Andrew Panay. Paradise Delayed is about living on a remote Panamanian island in the Caribbean, where Usher wrote about the challenges faced in developing an off-grid lifestyle.

References

External links 
 100goals100weeks.com
 IanUsher.com – personal website
 TEDxVienna Talk – "A Life Unlimited" – video

1963 births
Living people
21st-century English writers